Elektrėnai Municipality is one of sixty municipalities in Lithuania.

Elderships 
Elektrėnai Municipality is divided into 8 elderships:

 
Municipalities of Vilnius County
Municipalities of Lithuania